Antisemitism is a growing problem in 21st-century Germany.

Definition
In May 2016, a new definition of antisemitism (the Working Definition of Antisemitism) was agreed upon at the Berlin-based International Holocaust Remembrance Alliance (IHRA) Conference, stating that "holding Jews collectively responsible for actions of the state of Israel" is antisemitic.

Context
In 1998, Ignatz Bubis, a leader of the German Jewish community, pointed to a "spreading intellectual nationalism" that made him fear a revival of German antisemitism. Others point to Germany's growing Muslim population, both the Turkish "guest workers" who began to arrive in the 1950s, and the large wave of migrants from the Muslim countries who arrive during the European migrant crisis that began in 2015. In 2002, the historian Julius Schoeps said that "resolutions by the German parliament to reject antisemitism are drivel of the worst kind" and "all those ineffective actions are presented to the world as a strong defense against the charge of antisemitism. The truth is: no one is really interested in these matters. No one really cares."

Extent
A 2012 poll showed that 18% of the Turks in Germany think of Jews as inferior human beings. A similar study found that most of Germany's native born Muslim youth and children of immigrants have antisemitic views.

In 2014, antisemitic activities in Germany prompted the German Chancellor Angela Merkel to lead a rally in Berlin against antisemitism in Germany. In that same year, about 3,500 people rallied in front of the Frankfurt City Hall to protest against a wave of antisemitic incidents in Germany.  A few hundred of the protesters were from the Kurdish-Israeli Friendship Association.  According to the JTA, "Merkel expressed her support for the event in a letter."

The number of crimes against Jews and Jewish institutions continued to increase in 2018. In a 2018 survey conducted by the European Union, 85% of Jewish respondents in Germany said that antisemitism was a "very big" or "fairly big" issue, and 89% said that antisemitism had become a worse problem in the last five years. In February 2019, crime data released by the government for 2018 and published in Der Tagesspiegel showed a yearly increase of 10%, with 1,646 crimes linked to a hatred of Jews in 2018, with the totals not finalised as yet. There was a 60% rise in physical attacks (62 violent incidents, vs 37 in 2017). Germany also reported a new record of cases linked to hatred of Jews in 2020, with 2,275 crimes with an antisemitic background until the end of January 2021.

Characteristics of antisemites in Germany
In police statistics, more than 90 percent of incidents are counted as "right wing extremism". But government officials and Jewish leaders doubt that figure, because cases with unknown perpetrators and some kinds of attacks get automatically classified as "extreme right".

A 2017 study on Jewish perspectives on antisemitism in Germany by Bielefeld University found that individuals and groups belonging to the extreme right and extreme left were equally represented as perpetrators of antisemitic harassment and assault, while the largest part of the attacks were committed by Muslim assailants. The study also found that 70% of the participants feared a rise in antisemitism due to immigration citing the antisemitic views of the refugees.

A study among Jews, that was published by the European Union in 2018, has also listed Muslims as the biggest perpetrator group of antisemitic incidents in Germany; 41% of attacks were committed by extremist Muslims, 20% by far-right and 16% by far-left extremists, according to the study.

In its 2017 summary, the Federal Office for the Protection of the Constitution (BfV) concluded that antisemitic rhetoric spread by Islamist organizations posed a significant challenge to a peaceful and tolerant society.

Incidents
In January 2017, a German court in the city of Wuppertal upheld the 2015 decision of a lower court which deemed an attempt by three Muslim attackers (German Palestinians) to burn down a synagogue in 2014 (on the anniversary of Kristallnacht) to be a means of "drawing attention to the Gaza conflict" with Israel, despite the fact that attacks on Jews and Jewish institutions as a result of the actions of the state of Israel amounts to collective punishment and a form of antisemitism. The offenders were not sent to prison.

The German regional court ruled that the actions of the three perpetrators were governed by anti-Israelism and not antisemitism, while the attackers received suspended sentences. Green Party MP Volker Beck protested the ruling, saying: "This is a decision as far as the motives of the perpetrators are concerned. What do Jews in Germany have to do with the Middle East conflict? Every bit as much as Christians, non-religious people or Muslims in Germany, namely, absolutely nothing. The ignorance of the judiciary toward antisemitism is for many Jews in Germany especially alarming."

Dr. Moshe Kantor, president of the European Jewish Congress (EJC), said: "It is unbelievable that attempts to burn a synagogue have been equated with displeasure of Israeli government policies." "This has now given a carte blanche to antisemites across Germany to attack Jews because a German court has given them a ready justification."

In 2018, an Israeli Arab was attempting to win an argument with a Jewish friend by proving that he could walk freely through Berlin wearing a Jewish skullcap. However, he was attacked by a group of Arabic-speaking men. The incident had been recorded and the video went viral.

In 2018, the Echo Music Prize was awarded to rappers who featured antisemitic clichés in their lyrics. As a consequence of protests from artists and the press, the Echo Award was discontinued.

On October 9, 2019, a lone gunman attacked a synagogue in Halle during Yom Kippur but failed to gain access to the building, although two doors were damaged when improvised explosives set off. Later the attacker shot dead a female pedestrian in the street and a man at a nearby Turkish kebab shop.

In September 2021, German police averted a possible Islamic attack on a synagogue in Hagen during Yom Kippur services, arresting four people including a 16-year-old Syrian youth.

See also
 Antisemitism in Europe
 Antisemitism in 21st-century France
 Antisemitism in 21st-century Italy
 Geography of antisemitism
Germany–Israel relations
 History of the Jews in Europe
History of the Jews in Germany
 Racism in Europe
Racism in Germany

References

21st century in Germany
21st-century Judaism
Germany